The United States of America is a federal republic consisting of 50 states, a federal district (Washington, D.C., the capital city of the United States), five major territories, and various minor islands. Both the states and the United States as a whole are each sovereign jurisdictions. The Tenth Amendment to the United States Constitution allows states to exercise all powers of government not delegated to the federal government. Each state has its own constitution and government, and all states and their residents are represented in the federal Congress, a bicameral legislature consisting of the Senate and the House of Representatives. Each state is represented by two senators, while representatives are distributed among the states in proportion to the most recent constitutionally mandated decennial census. Additionally, each state is entitled to select a number of electors to vote in the Electoral College, the body that elects the president of the United States, equal to the total of representatives and senators in Congress from that state. The federal district does not have representatives in the Senate, but has a non-voting delegate in the House, and it is also entitled to electors in the Electoral College. Congress can admit more states, but it cannot create a new state from territory of an existing state or merge of two or more states into one without the consent of all states involved, and each new state is admitted on an equal footing with the existing states.

The United States has control over fourteen territories. Five of them (American Samoa, Guam, the Northern Mariana Islands, Puerto Rico, and the U.S. Virgin Islands) have a permanent, nonmilitary population, while nine of them (the United States Minor Outlying Islands) do not. With the exception of Navassa Island, Puerto Rico, and the U.S. Virgin Islands, which are located in the Caribbean, all territories are located in the Pacific Ocean. One territory, Palmyra Atoll, is considered to be incorporated, meaning the full body of the Constitution has been applied to it; the other territories are unincorporated, meaning the Constitution does not fully apply to them. Ten territories (the Minor Outlying Islands and American Samoa) are considered to be unorganized, meaning they have not had an organic act enacted by Congress; the four other territories are organized, meaning an organic act has been enacted by Congress. The five inhabited territories each have limited autonomy in addition to having territorial legislatures and governors, but residents cannot vote in federal elections, although all are represented by non-voting delegates in the House.

The largest state by population is California, with a population of 39,538,223 people, while the smallest is Wyoming, with a population of 576,851 people; the federal district has a larger population (689,545) than both Wyoming and Vermont. The largest state by area is Alaska, encompassing 665,384 square miles (1,723,337 square kilometers), while the smallest is Rhode Island, encompassing 1,545 square miles (4,001 square kilometers). The most recent states to be admitted, Alaska and Hawaii, were admitted in 1959. The largest territory by population is Puerto Rico, with a population of 3,285,874 people (larger than 21 states), while the smallest is the Northern Mariana Islands, with a population of 47,329 people. Puerto Rico is the largest territory by area, encompassing 5,325 square miles (13,791 square kilometers); the smallest territory, Kingman Reef, encompasses only 0.005 square miles (0.01 square kilometers).

States

Federal district

Territories

Inhabited territories

Uninhabited territories

Disputed territories

See also

 Aboriginal title in the United States
 Historic regions of the United States
 List of Indian reservations in the United States
 List of regions of the United States
 Lists of U.S. state topics
 Local government in the United States
 Organized incorporated territories of the United States
 Proposals for a 51st state
 Territorial evolution of the United States
 U.S. territorial sovereignty

Explanatory notes

References

External links

 State Resource Guides, from the Library of Congress
 State and Territorial Governments on USA.gov

 
United States
United States, States

States and territories
States
 
jv:Pamérangan pulitik Amérika Sarékat